Jim Burke Jr. is an American film producer.

Burke, who is a graduate of the University of Minnesota, was a founding member of Rysher Entertainment. He was the President of Ad Hominem Enterprises, a production company he shared with Alexander Payne and Jim Taylor. The company had a first look deal with Fox Searchlight Pictures. He also served as President of Production at Focus Features.

On January 24, 2012, he was nominated for an Oscar for the movie The Descendants.

In 2019, he won the Academy Award for Best Picture for producing Green Book.

Over his career, Burke has been involved with films that have garnered 27 Academy Award nominations and 7 Oscars.

Burke is living in Hawaii and nearly has nearly completed his final film as a producer. He is married to Christina Simpkins and father to New York sports broadcaster Madelyn Burke. He is dedicated to being an apprentice kama’aina and to being of service to the people of his beloved island home.

Early Life and Career 
Burke is the oldest of six children born and raised in Edina, Minnesota. Burke graduated from the University of Minnesota’s College of Liberal Arts. In 2011, he was honored with the University’s Alumni of Notable Achievement Award.

Prior to his senior year, he arranged for his family to audition for the popular game show Family Feud. Selected as contestants, against all odds, his family won. It was that experience in Los Angeles that enabled Burke to believe a career in show business was achievable.

After graduation he drove to Los Angeles in a Pinto station wagon and set out on his unlikely professional adventure.

His first job was as a “satellite jockey” coordinating news and sports satellite feeds. In that job he was introduced to the business of television syndication—the sales of film and television shows to broadcasters nationwide.

Lorimar Television / Warner Bros 
Within a year, he landed a job at Lorimar Television, which soon after was acquired by Warner Bros. During his 7 years at Warner, after watching thousands of Warner Bros. films, Burke grew to become the studio’s authority on its vast film library.

Rysher Entertainment 
When the opportunity arose, he followed his dream and pursued a career in filmmaking. He was a founding member of Rysher Entertainment—a fledgling film and television company which soon after scored a notable success with the hit syndicated TV show, Saved By The Bell. The enormous profits that show provided were immediately plowed into a small film slate, primarily for HBO.

Rysher was then bought by Cox Communications and provided with the resources to make a full slate of theatrical films. Over the next 5 years Burke supervised the development, production and release of over 30 films. Some of the most notable were, Primal Fear, Private Parts, Kiss the Girls, The Saint, Kingpin, Big Night, and Hard Eight. The experience was invigorating but impersonal. Burke wanted to get closer to the films and make a stylistic imprint.

Ad Hominem 
While at Rysher, Burke read a script written by two friends entitled Election. It was the best script he had ever read and was driven to getting it made. When making Election he formed a bond with writer Jim Taylor and director Alexander Payne. Sharing the same film aesthetic, the decided to form a production company, Ad Hominem. Ad Hominem, funded by Fox Searchlight, was dedicated to making human films.

At Ad Hominem the trio made several films including The Savages, and Oscar nominated The Descendants, starring George Clooney. Burke spent 7 months in Honolulu while making The Descendants and fell in love with Hawaii’s history, culture and people.

Focus Features 
While preparing the film Downsizing, Burke was unexpectedly approached with an offer to become the President of Production for specialized film groundbreaker and Universal Studios-based Focus Features. At Focus he was tasked with making between 4-8 quality films a year. During that time, he developed a film that came to known as Green Book. He felt so strongly about the film that he asked to be let out of his deal to produce the film. Focus graciously agreed in exchange that he sign a “first look deal” with the studio.

Green Book went on the be a hit worldwide and was named best picture of the year by the Academy, Golden Globes, Producers Guild and many critics organizations.

Filmography and awards

References

External links

Living people
American film producers
Place of birth missing (living people)
Year of birth missing (living people)
Golden Globe Award-winning producers
Producers who won the Best Picture Academy Award
University of Minnesota alumni